Amauri Jeremiah Hardy (born April 30, 1998) is an American professional basketball player for the Texas Legends of the NBA G League. He played college basketball for the UNLV Runnin' Rebels and the Oregon Ducks. He is currently participating in the NBA Summer League with the Cleveland Cavaliers.

High school career
Hardy began his high school career Southfield High School, where he averaged 12 points per game as a freshman. He averaged 19 points per game as a sophomore but was limited to four games because of an MCL injury. Following his sophomore season, Hardy transferred to North Farmington High School. He averaged 21 points, four rebounds, six assists and six steals per game as a junior, helping the team reach the Class A state championship game. On January 20, 2017, Hardy scored 46 points in a 63–58 overtime loss to West Bloomfield High School. As a senior, Hardy averaged 29 points, seven rebounds, six assists and six steals per game, helping the team finish 11–9. He was a finalist for the Mr. Basketball of Michigan award. On December 9, 2016, Hardy initially committed to playing college basketball for Oklahoma State over Georgia, Georgia Tech and Florida. However, he reopened his recruitment after coach Brad Underwood left to take the job at Illinois, and committed to UNLV in April 2017.

College career
Hardy averaged 5 points and 1.6 assists per game as a freshman. As a sophomore, Hardy averaged 13.1 points, 3.5 assists and 3 rebounds per game. On November 9, 2019, he scored a career-high 27 points in a 60–56 overtime loss to Kansas State. Hardy averaged 14.5 points, 3.3 rebounds and 3.3 assists per game as a junior, earning Third Team All-Mountain West Conference honors. He graduated and opted to transfer to Oregon, choosing the Ducks over Arkansas. As a senior, Hardy averaged 3.9 points and 2.2 assists per game. He made 13 starts while Will Richardson recovered from a thumb injury. Following the season, Hardy declared for the 2021 NBA draft and signed with an agent.

Professional career

NBA G League Ignite (2021–2022)
In September 2021, Hardy signed with the NBA G League Ignite, becoming the first college player to join the team. He was suspended for breaking a team rule at the end of November.

Texas Legends (2022–present)
On November 3, 2022, Hardy was named to the opening night roster for the Texas Legends.

Career statistics

College

|-
| style="text-align:left;"| 2017–18
| style="text-align:left;"| UNLV
| 33 || 0 || 18.9 || .405 || .294 || .727 || 1.5 || 1.6 || .4 || .2 || 5.0
|-
| style="text-align:left;"| 2018–19
| style="text-align:left;"| UNLV
| 31 || 19 || 29.6 || .439 || .341 || .685 || 3.0 || 3.5 || .7 || .2 || 13.1
|-
| style="text-align:left;"| 2019–20
| style="text-align:left;"| UNLV
| 32 || 30 || 34.6 || .409 || .333 || .697 || 3.3 || 3.3 || .7 || .2 || 14.5
|-
| style="text-align:left;"| 2020–21
| style="text-align:left;"| Oregon
| 28 || 13 || 19.5 || .413 || .241 || .647 || 1.3 || 2.2 || .2 || .1 || 3.9
|- class="sortbottom"
| style="text-align:center;" colspan="2"| Career
| 124 || 62 || 25.8 || .419 || .323 || .693 || 2.3 || 2.7 || .5 || .2 || 9.2

Personal life
Hardy's younger brother, Jaden was a second round pick in the 2022 NBA Draft to the Mavericks. His father, Ramsey, competed for Tuskegee at the college level.

References

External links
Oregon Ducks bio
UNLV Runnin' Rebels bio

1998 births
Living people
American men's basketball players
Basketball players from Detroit
NBA G League Ignite players
North Farmington High School alumni
Oregon Ducks men's basketball players
Point guards
Southfield High School alumni
UNLV Runnin' Rebels basketball players